Bronco is an unincorporated community in Walker County, in the U.S. state of Georgia.

History
A post office called Bronco was established in 1884, and remained in operation until 1905. The community was named after the bronco horse. A variant name was "Sylvan Bower". Bronco once supported a schoolhouse, the Bronco School, now defunct.

References

Unincorporated communities in Walker County, Georgia
Unincorporated communities in Georgia (U.S. state)